Yoon Jang-ho (Hanja: 尹章豪; September 21, 1980 – February 27, 2007) was a South Korean soldier. 

Yoon was staff sergeant (posthumous) serving as an English translator in Afghanistan as a member of the Task Force Dasan, a dispatched engineering unit of the Republic of Korea Army.  He was killed during the suicide bomb attack on a military base in Bagram on February 27, 2007.  The attack occurred at the front gate, where he was waiting to greet two local residents into the base. Yoon is the first member of the Republic of Korea Armed Forces to be killed by enemy action since the Vietnam War.

Early life and education
Born on September 21, 1980, Yoon Jang-ho was the youngest of three children.  After graduating from elementary school in Seoul in 1994, he received secondary education in New York. He graduated from the Kelley School of Business at Indiana University with an undergraduate degree in business in 2003 and started attending the Southern Baptist Theological Seminary in early 2004.

Career
In December 2004, Yoon returned to South Korea and joined the South Korean army's Special Warfare Command as a translator in June 2005.  He was dispatched to Afghanistan in September 2006, and was to return to South Korea on March 14, 2007 for a planned discharge in June.  He was promoted to staff sergeant and received the Inheon Order of Military Merit and the Bronze Star posthumously.

See also
Republic of Korea Armed Forces overseas casualties

Notes

References

1980 births
2007 deaths
Kelley School of Business alumni
Southern Baptist Theological Seminary alumni
Korean military personnel killed in action
South Korean military personnel
Military personnel killed in the War in Afghanistan (2001–2021)
People from Seoul